Bruce Saville (born December 5, 1944) is a Canadian businessman and philanthropist who currently lives in Edmonton, Alberta. He is former shareholder of the Edmonton Oilers before the Edmonton Investors Group was sold.

Career

Early career 
Saville started his career working in the Sales and Service division of Goodyear in Ontario. As part of his job, he was required to create 10-page summary reports using a manual calculator and data from a 4-foot thick computer printout generated each month. Saville sought to computerize this process. He brought the idea of computerization to Goodyear's IT department; they replied they were too busy.

At Saville's next hockey game he then approached a member of his hockey team who was a systems analyst. At the following hockey game, his teammate came with five volumes of Cobol programming manuals.

Saville read the manuals, then developed a system which he took to the Goodyear IT department, who ran it and it worked. This was Saville's first entry into the computer industry. He then proceeded to work as a systems analyst at Goodyear and then Canada Systems Group.
In 1974, Saville was hired at Northern Telephone as Manager of Computer Programming.

Saville Systems 
In Edmonton in 1982, he established BASA which provided billing solutions to telecommunication companies. The company grew with the industry and customers included AT&T, Sprint, Unitel, Deutsche Telekom, and Nippon Telecom. The company eventually attained 1,700 employees.

In October 1999, the company was bought by ADC Telecommunication. ADC was eventually bought by Intec Telecom Systems of Great Britain.

After Saville Systems 
With the money from the sale, Saville established the Saville Interest Group. He is president.

From 1998 to 2008 he was one of three senior investors in the Edmonton Oilers. During this time he also billeted a Czech Oilers player.

On April 5, 2010, it was announced that Saville would join the board of Serenic Corporation.

Philanthropy 
Before selling Saville Systems, Saville decided to hire a president to reduce his work load. At around the same time, Saville received a questionnaire in the mail from the Inner City Agencies Foundation. He was then invited to his first meeting where he was then appointed board chair.

He is also a board member of Stollery Children's Hospital, Noujaim Institute, Brentwood College since 2003, and previous board member of NAIT, and Governor of the University of Alberta. It was during this time that Saville also made multiple donations to the university which helped fund the Saville Community Sports Centre.

He is also Chairman of the Edmonton Oilers Community Foundation.

Personal life 
Saville has been an avid ice hockey fan and player all his life. As a player he is a goalie.

He currently lives in Edmonton in a house valued at more than $7 million.

References

1944 births
Living people
Businesspeople from Edmonton
Canadian philanthropists
Edmonton Oilers executives